Marco d'Agrate (c. 1504 – c. 1574) was an Italian sculptor of the Renaissance period, active mainly in Lombardy.

He was born to a family of sculptors, and collaborated with his brother  Gian Francesco in a monument to Sforzino Sforza found in  Basilica of Santa Maria della Steccata in Parma. Also worked on the tomb of Giovanni del Conte in the Basilica of San Lorenzo in Milan, and for the facade of the Certosa of Pavia.

His best known work is the statue of St Bartholomew Flayed (1562), depicting Bartholomew the Apostle, found in the transept of the Cathedral of Milan. He signed it with a line that states: I was not made by Praxiteles but by Marco d'Agrate (Non mi fece Prassitele, bensì Marco d'Agrate).

Sources
The information in this article is based on that in its Italian equivalent.

1500s births
1570s deaths
Renaissance sculptors
16th-century Italian sculptors
Italian male sculptors
Artists from Lombardy